All Nations International School 

This is a list of notable international schools in Sri Lanka.

 
Sri Lanka
 International